The Winton Professorship of the Public Understanding of Risk is a professorship within the Statistical Laboratory of the University of Cambridge. It was established in 2007 in perpetuity by a benefaction of £3.3m from the Winton Charitable Foundation, and is the only professorship of its type in the United Kingdom. There is an associated internet-based program devoted to understanding uncertainty.

List of Winton Professors 

 2007– David Spiegelhalter

See also 

 David Harding

References

External links 
 £20 million donation to revolutionise physics research

Public Understanding of Risk, Winton
Faculty of Mathematics, University of Cambridge
2007 establishments in England
Public Understanding of Risk, Winton